This is a list of rural localities in Sakhalin Oblast. Sakhalin Oblast is a federal subject of Russia (an oblast) comprising the island of Sakhalin and the Kuril Islands in the Russian Far East. Its administrative center and the largest city is Yuzhno-Sakhalinsk. Population: 497,973 (2010 Census). Besides people from other parts of the former Soviet Union and the Korean Peninsula, the oblast is home to Nivkhs and Ainu, with the latter having lost their language in Sakhalin recently. Sakhalin is rich in natural gas and oil, and is Russia's second wealthiest federal subject. It borders Khabarovsk Krai to the west and Hokkaido, Japan to the south.

Locations 
 17 km
 Chekhov
 Gornozavodsk
 Goryachiye Klyuchi
 Krabozavodskoye
 Malokurilskoye
 Nysh
 Pogibi

See also 
 
 Lists of rural localities in Russia

References 

Sakhalin Oblast